Tarphops is a genus of large-tooth flounders native to the northwest Pacific Ocean.

Species
The currently recognized species in this genus are:
 Tarphops elegans Amaoka, 1969
 Tarphops oligolepis (Bleeker, 1858)

References

Paralichthyidae
Marine fish genera
Ray-finned fish genera
Taxa named by David Starr Jordan